This is a list of historic houses in the US state of Pennsylvania.

Delaware County
 Allgates
 Cobble Court
 Nitre Hall
 Federal School
 Grange Estate

Philadelphia
 List of houses in Fairmount Park

See also 
 List of historic houses

Houses in Pennsylvania
History of Pennsylvania
Pennsylvania culture
Historic houses